Bengal Institute of Technology & Management (BITM) is a self-financing engineering college in West Bengal, India.It was established in 2001. It is affiliated with Maulana Abul Kalam Azad University of Technology and all the programmes are approved by the All India Council for Technical Education.

It is located along Sriniketan bypass, Doranda, Bolpur, Birbhum.

Academics
The institute offers ten undergraduate courses:

B.Tech in Electronics and Communication Engineering (ECE) - 4 years (approved intake - 90)
 B.Tech in Applied Electronics and Instrumentation Engineering (AEIE) - 4 years (approved intake - 60)
 B.Tech in Electrical Engineering (EE) - 4 years (approved intake - 60)
 B.Tech in Mechanical Engineering (ME) - 4 years (approved intake - 180)
 B.Tech in Computer Science and Engineering (CSE) - 4 years (approved intake - 90)
 B.Tech in Civil Engineering (CE) - 4 years (approved intake - 120)
 B.Tech in Information Technology (IT) - 4 years (approved intake - 60)
Bachelor in Business Administration - 3 years (approved intake - 60)
Bachelor in Computer Application - 3 years (approved intake - 60)
Bachelor in Hotel Management - 3 years (approved intake - 60)

The following postgraduate degree programs are offered:

 M.Tech. in Electronics and Communication Engineering (ECE) - 2 years (approved intake - 18)
M.Tech. in Computer Science & Engineering - 2 years (approved intake - 18)
M.Tech. in Electrical Engineering (EE) - 2 years (approved intake - 18)
Master in Business Administration - 2 years (approved intake - 60)
Master in Computer Application - 3 years (approved intake - 60)

It also offers diploma courses.

See also

References

External links
 Official website

Private engineering colleges in India
Engineering colleges in West Bengal
Universities and colleges in Birbhum district
Educational institutions established in 2001
2001 establishments in West Bengal